"Bestie" is a song by American rappers DaBaby and YoungBoy Never Broke Again. It was first released on January 10, 2022 along with their other single "Hit", as a combined record called "Bestie/Hit". It is the third single from their collaborative mixtape Better than You (2022), and was sent to rhythmic contemporary radio on April 19, 2022.

Composition
Jon Powell of Revolt described the song as "full of the hard-hitting vibes that both artists are well known for".

Music video
The official music video was released on March 23, 2022 and directed by DaBaby. It finds two women entering DaBaby's house to party and take over his residence with drugs such as lean. NBA YoungBoy appears through FaceTime. The video also features a compilation of TikTok clips of a dance challenge to the song.

Charts

References

2022 singles
2022 songs
DaBaby songs
YoungBoy Never Broke Again songs
Songs written by DaBaby
Songs written by YoungBoy Never Broke Again
Atlantic Records singles
Interscope Records singles